Hoima Sugar Limited (HSL), also Hoima Sugar is a sugar manufacturer in Uganda, the third-largest economy in the East African Community.

Location
The sugar plantation lies adjacent to Budongo Forest, home of the Ugandan mangabey, and host to an estimated 550 chimpanzees. The coordinates of the factory are 1°15'09.0"N, 31°11'36.0"E (Latitude:1.252490; Longitude:31.193326).

Overview
The company is a medium-sized sugar manufacturer, established in 2016, with production capacity of 1,500 metric tonnes daily. The factory had signed up 450 out-growers as at May 2016, with that number expected to grow to 2,000 by 2017. The total work force at the company is projected to grow to 5,000, once all systems are operational. A thermal power co-generation facility is planned. The total investment is calculated at US$42 million.

Ownership
The business is owned by Rai Holdings. The family-owned group has a 70 percent shareholding in Kinyara Sugar Works in neighboring Masindi District and also owns West Kenya Sugar Limited, and Sukari Industries both in Kenya.

See also

References

External links

Food and drink companies established in 2016
Hoima District
Western Region, Uganda
Sugar companies of Uganda
Agriculture in Uganda